Melvyn Jaminet (born 30 June 1999) is a French rugby union player who plays for Stade Toulousain in the Top 14 and the France national team.

Biography 
Melvyn Jaminet was called by Fabien Galthié to the French national team for the first time in June 2021, for the Australia summer tour.

Honours

International 
 France
Six Nations Championship: 2022
Grand Slam: 2022

Club 
 Perpignan
Pro D2: 2020–21

References

External link
Toulouse profile
France profile at FFR
Allrugby profile

1999 births
Living people
French rugby union players
USA Perpignan players
Stade Toulousain players
Sportspeople from Hyères
Rugby union fullbacks
France international rugby union players